John "Rudy" Bell (January 1, 1881 – July 28, 1955), born Rudolph Fred Baerwald, was a Major League Baseball outfielder. Bell played for the New York Highlanders in the  season. In 17 career games, he had 11 hits, 3 RBIs and a .212 batting average. He batted and threw right-handed.

Bell was born in Wausau, Wisconsin, and died in Albuquerque, New Mexico.

External links

1881 births
1955 deaths
Sportspeople from Wausau, Wisconsin
New York Highlanders players
Major League Baseball outfielders
Baseball players from Wisconsin
Minor league baseball managers
Pittsburg Coal Diggers players
Joplin Miners players
Butte Miners players
Newark Indians players
Memphis Egyptians players
Memphis Turtles players
Memphis Chickasaws players
Galveston Pirates players
Oklahoma City Senators players